Amatus of Nusco, in Italian Amato di Nusco  (c. 1003–1093) was the first bishop of Nusco in Irpinia, southern Italy. The most likely account of him is that he was of noble birth, a native of the South of Italy, that he distributed all his worldly goods to the poor, became a priest, and afterwards a monk in the Abbey of Monte Vergine. He died (probably) on 30 September 1093. Numerous miracles were reported at the site of his tomb and his cult developed to the point where he became recognised as a saint in the Roman Catholic Church, celebrated in the Roman Martyrology on 30 September.

The monks of Montevergine regarded him as a disciple of William of Vercelli  and accordingly argued for 30 September 1193 as the date of his death.

References

Sources
http://www.santiebeati.it/dettaglio/90414

External links
Katolsk.no: Amatus of Nusco

1000s births
1093 deaths
Year of birth uncertain
People from the Province of Avellino
Italian Roman Catholic saints
11th-century Italian clergy
11th-century Christian saints